Senate elections were held in Thailand on 29 March 2014 for the second time under the 2007 constitution. Half the senate seats were elected for non-partisan candidates under the first-past-the-post voting system, with voters electing one senator per province. Turnout fell to 43% from 56% in the 2008 senate elections and 46% in the February 2014 general election, which had been boycotted by the opposition, to only 42.51%.

Background
The elections took place against the background of a political crisis in Thailand between the Shinawatra family, who have won all recent elections and are popular among the poor in the rural north, and the royalist and middle class establishment in Bangkok, who accuse them of corruption. The general election in February 2014 was boycotted by the opposition Democrat Party amid street protests against the government of Prime Minister Yingluck Shinawatra. A week before the senate election the Constitutional Court annulled the general election.

The Prime Minister and most of the ruling MPs are facing investigation by the National Anti Corruption Commission, who can refer politicians to the senate for impeachment. The Senate can pass an impeachment with a 60% majority, which results in a ban from political office for five years.

Electoral system
The 2007 constitution provided for a 150-seat Senate, of which just under half are appointed by a Senators Selection Committee, made up of establishment figures. According to political scientist Duncan McCargo, "most appointed senators are broadly in the pro-Democrat camp" which is opposed to the acting government of Prime Minister Yingluck Shinawatra. A local think tank, the Siam Intelligence Unit, estimates that 90% of the appointed senators are anti-government.

Elected senators must be independent from political parties, with no immediate relatives in parliament and must not have been a member of a political party in the last 5 years. However, most winning candidates have been endorsed by powerful local party-linked institutions.

Results
There were 443 candidates for the 77 elected seats - an average of 5.5 per seat. There were 48.7 million voters registered for the election and turnout was 42.51%. This included 4.5% of voters who went to vote and cast blank or invalid votes.

In the capital Bangkok, the seat was won by Auditor-General Jaruwan Maintaka, who is best known for her membership of the "Asset Scrutiny Committee" set up by the military government following the 2006 Thailand coup. The election of Jaruwan who is a known critic of former Prime Minister Thaksin Shinawatra was seen as an attempt of the Bangkok electorate to reduce the influence of the pro-Thaksin camp on Thai politics. Despite the requirement to be non-partisan, several new Senators are informally linked to different political camps. Udon Thani Province in the Northeast, was won by the wife of Kwanchai Praipana, a local leader of the pro-government United Front for Democracy Against Dictatorship, or "red shirts". Chiang Mai Province was won by former deputy governor Adisorn Kamnerdsiri, who is considered close to the Pheu Thai Party of acting Prime Minister Yingluck Shinawatra. Samut Prakan Province elected Waraporn Asavahame, the niece of former deputy interior minister Vatana Asavahame who was convicted of corruption. Suphan Buri Province's new Senator Jongchai Thiangtham is a former deputy secretary-general of the Chartthaipattana Party.

References

Elections in Thailand
Thailand
Senate election
Election and referendum articles with incomplete results